Meniška Vas is a small settlement in the Municipality of Dolenjske Toplice in Slovenia. It lies at the confluence of the Sušica and Krka rivers. The area is part of the historical region of Lower Carniola. The municipality is now included in the Southeast Slovenia Statistical Region. 

The local church is dedicated to Saint Anthony the Hermit and belongs to the Parish of Toplice. It was built in the early 17th century.

References

External links
Meniška Vas on Geopedia

Populated places in the Municipality of Dolenjske Toplice